Bart van Nunen (born 24 September 1995, Utrecht) is a Dutch track and field athlete who specializes in the marathon.

On December 6, 2020, he set his current personal best in the marathon of 2:10:16 during the 2020 Valencia marathon in Valencia, Spain, which qualified him for the 2020 Summer Olympics.

Personal bests

Outdoor

Marathon - 2:10:16 (Valencia 6 December 2020)

References

Dutch male long-distance runners
1995 births
Living people
Sportspeople from Utrecht (city)
Athletes (track and field) at the 2020 Summer Olympics
Olympic athletes of the Netherlands
Olympic male marathon runners